Marco Martini (born 12 April 1979) is an Italian football coach and former footballer. He is an assistant coach with Alessandria.

Playing career
Born in Rimini, Emilia–Romagna, Martini started his career at Veneto club Padova. He then left for Chieti, Fano and Vis Pesaro. He played 4 seasons for Vis Pesaro before signed by Sambenedettese.

In January 2006 he joined Pescara along with Nico De Lucia. On 10 January he left for Frosinone in temporary deal. He won promotion playoffs at the end of 2005–06 Serie C1.

Martini returned to Pescara on 1 July 2006. He started 24 games in 2006–07 Serie B. The team relegated with the fewest points, fewest goals (along with Crotone) and the most goals conceded. Martini was the team top-scorer with 8 goals, ahead Daniele Vantaggiato with 7.

On 6 July 2007 he returned to Frosinone. He started 21 times. He had to compete with Éder and Massimo Margiotta in the second half of the season. That season he scored 5 goals, as the team fourth scorer behind Francesco Lodi, Éder and Felice Evacuo. Martini only made handful appearances in 2008–09 Serie B, and in January 2019 left for Reggiana. In August 2009 he left for Perugia along with Massimo Perra. After the bankrupt of Perugia, he joined Alessandria in July 2010. He renewed his contract in July 2011.

In January 2012 he was signed by Pro Vercelli in temporary deal with Stefano Santoni moved to opposite direction. On 23 August 2012 he left for Cuneo. On 31 January 2014 he terminated his contract with Cuneo and left for Santarcangelo.

Coaching career
From 2017 he served as an assistant coach with Rimini.

On 17 June 2019, he was hired as an assistant coach by Alessandria. On 19 January 2020, Cristiano Scazzola was dismissed as head coach and Martini served as a caretaker for a 1–0 victory in Serie C against Gozzano on 22 January 2020. On 24 January 2020, Alessandria hired new head coach, Angelo Gregucci, finishing Martini's caretaker stint.

References

External links
 Career summary by football.it

1979 births
Living people
Italian footballers
Serie B players
Calcio Padova players
Alma Juventus Fano 1906 players
Vis Pesaro dal 1898 players
A.S. Sambenedettese players
Delfino Pescara 1936 players
Frosinone Calcio players
A.C. Reggiana 1919 players
A.C. Perugia Calcio players
U.S. Alessandria Calcio 1912 players
F.C. Pro Vercelli 1892 players
A.C. Cuneo 1905 players
Association football forwards
Sportspeople from Rimini
Italian football managers
U.S. Alessandria Calcio 1912 managers
Serie C managers
Footballers from Emilia-Romagna